Eichberg-Trautenburg is a former municipality in the district of Leibnitz in the Austrian state of Styria. Since the 2015 Styria municipal structural reform, it is part of the municipality Leutschach an der Weinstraße.

Population

References

Cities and towns in Leibnitz District